The Rottnest ship graveyard is a ship graveyard and dump site located off Rottnest Island, Western Australia. It has been used for the disposal of obsolete ships since 1910. After World War II, the graveyard was also used for the disposal of Lend-Lease vehicles and aircraft.

As of 2006, the wrecks of 47 historically significant vessels are known to have been sunk in the Rottnest graveyard.

See also
Rottnest Island shipwrecks, for shipwrecks close to the island's shore

References

Rottnest Island
Shipwrecks of Western Australia
Ship graveyards
Ship disposal